Pilosocereus machrisii is a species of Pilosocereus found in from West Bahia to Minas Gerais, Brazil

References

External links

machrisii
Flora of Brazil